Desulfatibacillum aliphaticivorans  is a Gram-negative, non-spore-forming, sulfate-reducing and non-motile bacterium from the genus of Desulfatibacillum which has been isolated from marine sediments from the Gulf of Fos in France. Desulfatibacillum aliphaticivorans has the ability to degrade n-alkane and n-alkene.

References

External links 
Type strain of Desulfatibacillum aliphaticivorans at BacDive -  the Bacterial Diversity Metadatabase

Desulfobacterales
Bacteria described in 2004